Cidaris abyssicola is a species of sea urchin in the Family Cidaridae. Cidaris abyssicola was first scientifically described in 1869 by Alexander Emanuel Agassiz.

See also 

 Chorocidaris micca
 Cidaris
 Cidaris blakei

References 

Animals described in 1869
Cidaridae
Taxa named by Alexander Agassiz